Deion & Pilar: Prime Time Love is an American reality television series that airs on Oxygen. The series follows the home life of former professional athlete Deion Sanders and his wife Pilar.  It premiered on April 15, 2008.

Episodes

References

External links

2000s American reality television series
2008 American television series debuts
2008 American television series endings
English-language television shows
Oxygen (TV channel) original programming